Regulator of nonsense transcripts 1 is a protein that in humans is encoded by the UPF1 gene.

Function 

This gene encodes a protein that is part of a post-splicing multiprotein complex, the exon junction complex, involved in both mRNA nuclear export and mRNA surveillance. mRNA surveillance detects exported mRNAs with truncated open reading frames and initiates nonsense-mediated mRNA decay (NMD). When translation ends upstream from the last exon-exon junction, this triggers NMD to degrade mRNAs containing premature stop codons. This protein is located in both the cytoplasm and nucleus of the cell. When translation ends, it interacts with the protein that is a functional homolog of yeast Upf2p to trigger mRNA decapping. Use of multiple polyadenylation sites has been noted for this gene.

Interactions
UPF1 has been shown to interact with:

 DCP1A, 
 DCP2, 
 SMG1, 
 UPF2, 
 UPF3A, and 
 UPF3B.

References

Further reading